Amrish Gautam (born 21 December 1965) is an Indian cricketer. He played in 28 first-class and 7 List A matches for Uttar Pradesh from 1989/90 to 1994/95.

See also
 List of Uttar Pradesh cricketers

References

External links
 

1965 births
Living people
Indian cricketers
Uttar Pradesh cricketers
Cricketers from Lucknow